Rajaram (born 1 July 1968) is an Indian politician from Lalganj, Azamgarh district in Uttar Pradesh. He is a Member of Parliament, representing Uttar Pradesh in the Rajya Sabha (the upper house of India's Parliament) since November 2014. He belongs to the Bahujan Samaj Party.

Personal life
He is MSW Post Graduate from Kashi Vidyapeeth, Varanasi.

References

1968 births
Living people
Bahujan Samaj Party politicians from Uttar Pradesh
Rajya Sabha members from Uttar Pradesh
Politicians from Azamgarh district